Mary Joe Fernández was the defending champion but lost in the second round to Sandrine Testud.

First-seeded Lindsay Davenport won in the final 3–6, 6–1, 6–2 against Kimiko Date.

Seeds
A champion seed is indicated in bold text while text in italics indicates the round in which that seed was eliminated.

  Lindsay Davenport (champion)
  Kimiko Date (final)
  Mary Joe Fernández (second round)
  Amy Frazier (first round)
  Lori McNeil (second round)
  Judith Wiesner (quarterfinals)
  Marianne Werdel-Witmeyer (second round)
  Miriam Oremans (quarterfinals)

Draw

External links
 1995 Internationaux de Strasbourg draw

1995
1995 WTA Tour
1995 in French sport